Shorelint (foaled in 1926) was a Canadian Thoroughbred racehorse best known for winning the 1929 King's Plate, Canada's most important race. He was ridden by jockey John Mooney, a native of New Orleans, Louisiana who won the 1924 Kentucky Derby.

Shorelint's dam, South Shore, won the King's Plate in 1922.

References

1926 racehorse births
Racehorses bred in Canada
Racehorses trained in Canada
King's Plate winners
Thoroughbred family 12-b